Ingeniero Pablo Nogués (commonly known as Pablo Nogués) is a town in Malvinas Argentinas Partido of Buenos Aires Province, Argentina. It is located in the north west of the Greater Buenos Aires urban agglomeration.

External links

 municipal website map

Populated places in Buenos Aires Province
Malvinas Argentinas Partido
Cities in Argentina
Categoría:Lugares con nombres de personas de Argentina